Elsholtzia rugulosa is a species of the family Lamiaceae, native to Asia, mainly Burma, Vietnam and China. E. rugulosa is known in China as a local herbal tea, medicinal herb for colds and fever, and honey plant.

References

Lamiaceae
Flora of China
Flora of Myanmar
Flora of Thailand
Plants described in 1890